Stefan Kramer may refer to:

Stefan Krämer (born 1966), German football coach
Stefan Kramer (impressionist) (born 1982), Chilean impressionist, comedian and actor

See also
 Steve Kramer (disambiguation)
 Steven Cramer (born 1953), American poet